Under the Colombian Constitution of 1991, the president of Colombia is the head of state and head of government of the Republic of Colombia. As chief of the executive branch and head of the national government as a whole, the presidency is the highest political office in Colombia by influence and recognition. The president is also the commander-in-chief of the Military Forces of Colombia. The president is directly elected to a four-year term in a popular election. Since the passing of the Legislative Act 2 of 2004, no person may be elected president more than twice. In 2015, a constitutional amendment repealed the 2004 changes and reverted to the original one-term limit. Upon the death, resignation, or removal from office of an incumbent president, the vice president assumes the office. The president must be at least 30 years of age and a "natural born" citizen of Colombia.

Lists of presidents

Republic of Colombia (1819–1831)
This list includes those persons who were sworn into or forcibly took the office of president of the Republic of Colombia following the passing of the Colombian Constitution of 1832, which took effect on 30 August 1821.

The Republic of Colombia of 1821–1831 is now commonly referred to as the Gran Colombia to differentiate it from the present-day Republic of Colombia. Gran Colombia was the union of the territories that comprised the Viceroyalty of the New Granada under the uti possidetis principle, and it included the political entities that had formed in the New Granada after the initial wars of independence of 1810 against the Kingdom of Spain under King Joseph I; those included the Second Republic of Venezuela, the United Provinces of New Granada, the Presidency of Quito, and the Royal Audiencia of Panama.

The presidency dates back to the Congress of Angostura. This quasi-constituent assembly was formed to lay the ground work for a self-ruled governing administration after independence. The Constituent Assembly was formed by regional leaders that represented areas under rebel control; these areas did not include parts of what is now Colombia, as those areas were still under Spanish control, but aimed to legislate on its behalf. Congress elected an interim-executive officer and vested this figure with the title of president. Chosen to be first president of Colombia, was General Simón Bolívar y Palacios, leader of the revolutionary forces, who up to that point was titled "Supreme Chief" for his role in the revolution. The following day, Congress elected Francisco Antonio Zea Díaz, first vice president of Colombia. Bolívar was subsequently re-elected interim president by the Angostura Assembly on  after Colombia was conquered following the Battle of Boyacá, and elected again in 1821 in a permanent interim basis, pending national elections, by the Congress of Cúcuta, another constituent assembly mandated by the Angostura Assembly, and this time with elected officials representing the Colombian territories, during this time, and until 1826, the executive power was entrusted to the Vice President Francisco de Paula Santander y Omaña, while Bolívar was away in battle fighting to liberate Spanish colonies in Bolivia, and Peru. Bolívar was formally elected in a national election in 1826 for a period of four years, but on 27 August 1828, Bolívar declared martial law and assumed dictatorship style powers after the Congress of Ocaña failed to pass a new constitution. Bolívar eventually relinquished power in 1830, and Congress elected Joaquín de Mosquera y Arboleda as his successor, but was shortly deposed by General Rafael Urdaneta y Faría who hoped Bolívar would once again re-take power, but Bolívar not only declined the presidency, but also shortly died, leaving Urdaneta with no mandate for power. Urdaneta ceded executive-power to the Vice President Domingo Caycedo y Sanz de Santamaría, as Congress had impeached Mosquera for his failure to prevent the coup; during this time, and until 1832 the presidency remained vacant as there was no law for succession of power. In 1832, former Vice President Santander was elected by Congress as president of Gran Colombia, and it would be the last, since the territories of Venezuela and Ecuador broke away, which prompted the drafting of a new constitution.

Republic of New Granada (1832–1858)
This list includes those persons who were sworn into or forcibly took the office of president of the Republic of New Granada following the passing of the Colombian Constitution of 1832, which took effect on 26 November 1832.

There were 8 people in office serving a presidency each. All were popularly elected under an electoral college system except one, José María Melo y Ortiz who took power by mounting a coup d'état. Francisco de Paula Santander y Omaña, the first president, served initially on a provisional basis but in 1833 began a regular four-year term as president of the Republic of New Granada, to which he was popularly elected. Santander spent the longest time in office with 5 years and 22 days. José María Obando del Campo spent the shortest time in office with just 1 year and 6 days before being deposed.

The president and the vice president were elected separately two years apart for a period of four years each, resulting in a president having two vice presidents given normal circumstances. The Colombian Constitution of 1832, just like its predecessor, did not provide for a way to fill a vacancy in the presidency or the vicepresidency until the next electoral period, because of this the presidency was vacant between 1854 and 1857 when Melo, who had deposed President Obando in a coup, handed power to the previous administration; Obando would have taken back the presidency, but he had been impeached by Congress and hence there was no President to take power. During this time Vice President José de Obaldía y Orejuela served as Acting President until the end of his term, at which point the newly elected Vice President Manuel María Mallarino Ibargüen served as acting president for the remainder of the term Obando had been elected for until 1857 when Mariano Ospina Rodríguez was elected. The vice presidency was also vacant between 1837 and 1839, when Vice President José Ignacio de Márquez Barreto was elected president and the post remained vacant until the next vice presidencial election in 1839.

 Parties

Granadine Confederation (1858–1863)
This list includes those persons who were sworn into, succeeded to, or forcibly took office as President of the Granadine Confederation following the passing of the Colombian Constitution of 1858, which took effect on 22 May 1858.

The Constitution of 1858 abolished the Office of the Vice Presidency. The line of succession was modified by the introduction of the figures of 1st, 2nd, and 3rd Presidential Designates, who were elected annually by Congress amongst its members, but held no office or duties other than providing a succession to the presidency in the event of the President's temporal or permanent absence.

There were only 3 people in office who served a presidency each. Mariano Ospina Rodríguez initially took office in 1857 as the 8th and last President of the Republic of New Granada. In 1861 Julio Arboleda Pombo became the first person to be elected President of the Granadine Confederation under the new electoral college system set up by the new constitution, however during this time the country was going through a civil war and Congress was closed down. Furthermore, according to the new constitution the president had to take office before Congress; since this couldn't happen, Pombo could not take office and did not become the president. When Ospina's term ended on 1 April 1861, with no congress to swear in the elected president, the power would have been transferred to one of the Presidential Designates, however with Congress closed down no designates were elected for that year, and with no designates to succeed Ospina, the presidency was handed out to the next person in the line of succession which was the Inspector General, Bartolomé Calvo Díaz. Calvo's presidential tenure was short; within three months of holding the post, General Tomás Cipriano de Mosquera y Arboleda, leader of the Liberal forces, marched into Bogotá deposing Calvo in a coup d'état.

Giving the great animosity between Conservatives and Liberals at the time of the 1860-62 civil war, another thing that marked this period in regards to the presidency was that there were multiple attempts to undermine the government in power by laying claims on the presidency using various arguments. The first one of these was the Liberal General Juan José Nieto Gil, who claimed the presidency by disregarding the legitimacy of Ospina and claiming power in virtue of being the second presidential designate; he finally ceded power to his fellow Liberal General, Mosquera, when he took power in Bogotá. Mosquera had also claimants to the presidency in opposition to him. Julio Arboleda Pombo who was elected president but could not take office was appointed inspector general by President Calvo when he was in power, thus when Mosquera captured him, Arboleda claimed the presidency as the next in theline of succession to Calvo, even though that by this time the government and city had fallen, and the Conservative administration had fled the capital. After Arboleda was also captured by Mosquera a few days after Calvo was taken prisoner, the Secretary of Finance, Ignacio Gutiérrez Vergara, succeeded Arboleda to the claimed presidency as next in the line of succession being the oldest government secretary of the previous administration. When Gutiérrez was captured by Mosquera, the next in line of succession by age was the Secretary of Government and War, General Leonardo Canal González. As pretender to presidency, he moved the capital of the nation to Pasto, where he led the Conservative Government in exile. In 1862 Canal left to fight the Liberal forces and left Manuel del Río y de Narváez, his Secretary of Government and War, as acting president of the government-in-exile. This struggle for power all came to an end in 1863 when del Río finally capitulated to Mosquera presenting the surrender of the government-in-exile and recognising the presidency of Mosquera bringing the civil war to an end.

 Parties

United States of Colombia (1863–1886)
This list includes those persons who were sworn into, succeeded to, or forcibly took office as President of the United States of Colombia following the passing of the Colombian Constitution of 1863, which took effect on 8 May 1863.

There were 11 people in office, and 14 presidencies as three presidents served two non-consecutive terms each and are counted chronologically twice, they are: Tomás Cipriano de Mosquera y Arboleda, Manuel Murillo Toro, and Rafael Núñez Moledo, the last two having actually been elected twice. Out of the 11 individuals in office, 9 were elected, one succeeded to the presidency (José Eusebio Otálora Martínez), and one took the presidency by mounting a coup d'état (Santos Acosta Castillo). Only one president died in office from natural causes (Francisco Javier Zaldúa y Racines).

Tomás Cipriano de Mosquera y Arboleda, the first president of the United States of Colombia, had actually started his tenure in 1861 (he became the third and last president of the Granadine Confederation with a coup). In this capacity he was appointed by the National Constituent Assembly of 1863 to continue serving while the assembly drafted, passed, signed, and implemented a new constitution. The first elected president of the United States of Colombia was Manuel Murillo Toro, elected in 1864 for a constitutional two-year term. The longest serving president was Rafael Núñez Moledo with 10 years, 5 months, and 17 days, of which only 2 years, 4 months, and 5 days were actually served as the elected president of the United States of Colombia, but still longer than anyone else. Francisco Javier Zaldúa y Racines spent the shortest time in office with just 8 months, and 20 days in 1882.

The Colombian Constitution of 1858 had effectively abolished the vice presidency, and introduced a new line of succession system featuring the figures of first, second, and third presidential designates. These designates were elected annually by Congress amongst its members, but held no office or duties other than providing a succession for the president in the event of the resident's temporal or permanent absence. Both changes to vice presidency and presidential designates were kept by the Colombian Constitution of 1863. This system of succession was implemented in 1882 when President Zaldúa died in office and the third presidential designate, Clímaco Calderón Reyes, became acting president while the first presidential designate, Rafael Núñez Moledo, took office, however Núñez turned down the presidency and therefore the second presidential designate, José Eusebio Otálora Martínez, succeeded Zaldúa to presidency.

 Parties

Republic of Colombia (1886–present)
This list includes those persons who were sworn into, succeeded to, or forcibly took office as President of the present-day Republic of Colombia following the passing of the Colombian Constitution of 1886, which took effect on 6 August 1886. For Colombian leaders before this, see the above lists.

There have been 31 people in office, and 32 presidencies as Alfonso López Pumarejo served two non-consecutive terms and is counted chronologically as both the 14th and 16th president. Out of the 31 individuals in office, 26 were elected president, three succeeded to the presidency (Miguel Antonio Caro Tobar, Ramón González Valencia and Jorge Holguín Mallarino), two took the presidency by mounting a coup d'état (José Manuel Marroquín Ricaurte and Gustavo Rojas Pinilla against Manuel Antonio Sanclemente Sanclemente and Laureano Gómez Castro respectively), two permanently resigned from office (Rafael Reyes Prieto and Marco Fidel Suárez) and one died in office of natural causes (Rafael Núñez Moledo).

Rafael Núñez Moledo, the first president, was actually inaugurated in 1884 as the 14th and last president of the United States of Colombia for a two-year constitutional term; in this capacity he was appointed by the National Constituent Assembly of 1885 to serve a new six-year term while the assembly drafted, passed, signed, and implemented a new constitution; at the end of this term he was elected in 1892 for his first constitutional six-year term as president of Colombia. Núñez spent the longest time in office with 10 years, 5 months, and 17 days, but having only spent 2 years, 1 month, and 11 days as the elected president of Colombia before his death. The longest serving elected president was Álvaro Uribe Vélez with 8 years between 2002 and 2010 having been re-elected for a second term in 2006. Ramón González Valencia spent the shortest time in office with just 1 year between 1909 and 1910 when he was elected by Congress to finish the term that President Rafael Reyes Prieto had resigned to. The shortest serving elected president was Manuel Antonio Sanclemente Sanclemente with 1 year, 11 months, and 24 days before he was deposed. Carlos Eugenio Restrepo Restrepo, was the first president to serve under the new four-year constitutional term after the Constitutional Reform of 1910 when he was appointed president by that year's National Constituent Assembly; the first elected president to serve the four-year constitutional term would be his successor, José Vicente Concha Ferreira elected in 1914. Eduardo Santos Montejo was the first to be elected by men of all classes in 1938 after all land-ownership and literacy restrictions were repealed by the Constitutional Reform of 1936. Alberto Lleras Camargo in 1958 became the first president elected after women gained voting rights after the Constitutional Reform of 1954.

The vice presidency was abolished after the Constitutional Reform of 1905 and was only re-introduced after the passing of the Colombian Constitution of 1991 which remains in place. Article 127 of the Colombian Constitution of 1886 only allowed for re-election of the president in a non-immediate form; this was changed by the Constitutional Reform of 2005 allowing for immediate re-elections for a maximum of two terms.

Under the Colombian Constitution of 1991, the President of Colombia is the head of state and head of government of the Republic of Colombia. As chief of the executive branch and head of the national government as a whole, the presidency is the highest political office in Colombia as measure by influence and recognition. The president is also the commander-in-chief of the military of Colombia. The president is directly elected to a four-year term in a popular election. The Legislative Act 2 of 2004 established that no person may be elected president more than twice, allowing Álvaro Uribe and Juan Manuel Santos consecutive reelection in 2006 and 2014 respectively. Nonetheless, in 2015 Congress reformed the Constitution again and suppressed consecutive and non-consecutive presidential reelection. Since 1991 Constitution it was established that if no presidential candidate obtain more than 50% of the popular vote a run-off vote is needed. Upon the death, resignation, or removal from office of an incumbent president, the vice president assumes the office. The president must be at least 30 years of age and a "natural born" citizen of Colombia.

 Parties

Timeline

See also
 List of vice presidents of Colombia
 List of presidential designates of Colombia
 List of viceroys of New Granada

Notes

References

Further reading

External links

Colombia

Presidents